The Ministry of Tourism, Culture, Arts and Recreation is a provincial government department in Newfoundland and Labrador, Canada. The department is headed by a member of the provincial cabinet, typically a Member of the House of Assembly, who is chosen by the premier and formally appointed by the Lieutenant-Governor of Newfoundland and Labrador. The current Minister of Tourism, Culture, Arts, and Recreation is Steve Crocker.

The department was first created in October 2011, by the government of Kathy Dunderdale, it incorporated the former Department of Innovation, Trade and Rural Development and most of the programs from the former Department of Business. The department's lines of business included; business investment, business leadership, economic intelligence, industrial diversification, innovation, investment development, marketing, regulatory environment reform, and small and medium-sized enterprise development.

The department was reconfigured in 2017 as the department of Tourism, Culture, Industry and Innovation consolidating the former departments of Industry, Innovation, and Rural Development; and Business, Tourism, Culture and Rural Development. The department is responsible for tourism, business investment, heritage, provincial parks, and the arts.

The department was reconfigured in 2020 as the department of Tourism, Culture, Arts and Recreation.

Ministers
Key:

See also
Executive Council of Newfoundland and Labrador

References

External links
Tourism, Culture, Arts and Recreation website

Newfoundland and Labrador government departments and agencies
Newfoundland
Newfoundland
Newfoundland